Escape from New York is a 1981 American science fiction action film co-written, co-scored and directed by John Carpenter, and starring Kurt Russell, Lee Van Cleef, Ernest Borgnine, Donald Pleasence, Isaac Hayes, Adrienne Barbeau and Harry Dean Stanton.

The film's storyline, set in the near-future world of 1997, concerns a crime-ridden United States, which has converted Manhattan Island in New York City into the country's sole maximum-security prison. Air Force One is hijacked by anti-government insurgents who deliberately crash it into the walled borough. Ex-soldier and current federal prisoner Snake Plissken (Russell) is given just 24 hours to go in and rescue the President of the United States, after which, if successful, he will be pardoned.

Carpenter wrote the film in the mid-1970s in reaction to the Watergate scandal. After the success of Halloween (1978), he had enough influence to begin production and filmed it mainly in St. Louis, Missouri, on an estimated budget of $6 million. Debra Hill and Larry J. Franco served as the producers. The film was co-written by Nick Castle, who had collaborated with Carpenter by portraying Michael Myers in Halloween.

Released in the United States on July 10, 1981, the film received positive reviews from critics and was a commercial success, grossing more than $25.2 million at the box office. The film was nominated for four Saturn Awards, including Best Science Fiction Film and Best Direction. The film became a cult classic and was followed by a sequel, Escape from L.A. (1996), which was also directed and written by Carpenter and starred Russell.

Plot
In a dystopian 1988, amidst total war against an alliance of China and the Soviet Union, the United States government has turned Manhattan into a giant maximum-security prison to deal with a 400% increase in crime. A  wall surrounds the island, bridges have been mined, rivers are patrolled by helicopters and all prisoners unlucky to be alive are sentenced to life terms in Manhattan.

In 1997, while flying President John Harker to a peace summit in Hartford, Air Force One is hijacked by a guerrilla fighter of the "National Liberation Front of America" (named in reference to the Viet Cong) posing as the stewardess. Unable to regain control, Secret Service agents attach a tracking device to the President's arm and handcuff him to a briefcase of sensitive documents before putting him in the plane's escape pod. The aircraft crashes while the pod is ejected.

Police are dispatched to rescue the President. Romero, the right-hand man of the Duke of New York, a powerful crime boss, shows them a severed finger with the President's signet ring and warns that he will be killed if any further rescue attempts are made. Meanwhile, former Special Forces soldier Snake Plissken is about to be sent into Manhattan after being convicted of robbing the Federal Reserve. Police Commissioner Bob Hauk offers a deal to Snake: if he rescues the President in time for the summit, Hauk will arrange a full presidential pardon. To keep Snake from going rogue, Hauk has him injected with micro-explosives that will sever his carotid arteries in 22 hours. If Snake is successful, Hauk will neutralize the explosives.

Using a stealth glider to land atop the World Trade Center, Snake follows the President's tracker to a vaudeville theater only to find it on the wrist of a deluded vagrant. Convinced the President is dead, Snake radios Hauk but is told that he will be shot down if he returns without the President. Inspecting the escape pod, Snake is ambushed by dozens of starving "Crazies", and accidentally drops and destroys his radio while trying to flee. He is rescued by "Cabbie", a jovial old man who drives an armored taxi.

Cabbie takes Snake to Harold "Brain" Hellman, an adviser to the Duke and a former associate of Snake's. Brain, a brilliant engineer, has established a small gasoline refinery, fueling the city's remaining cars and tells Snake that the Duke plans to lead a mass escape across the (fictional) 69th Street Bridge by using the President as a human shield and following a landmine map that Brain has drawn up. Snake forces Brain and his girlfriend Maggie to lead him to the Duke's hideout at Grand Central Terminal. Snake finds the President but gets shot in the leg with a crossbow bolt and overpowered by the Duke's men.

While Snake is forced to fight against Duke's champion Slag in a deathmatch, Brain and Maggie kill Romero and flee with the President. Snake kills Slag and finds Brain, Maggie and the President at the top of the World Trade Center trying to escape in the glider. The inmates drop it off the roof, so the group returns to street level and encounters Cabbie who offers to take them across the bridge. Cabbie reveals that he bartered with Romero for the contents of the briefcase: a cassette tape which contains information about nuclear fusion, intended to be an international peace offering. The President demands the tape but Snake claims it.

The Duke pursues them onto the bridge in his customized Cadillac, setting off mines as he tries to catch up. Brain guides Snake but they hit a mine and Cabbie is killed. As they continue on foot, Brain accidentally stumbles into another mine. A distraught Maggie sacrifices herself to slow down the Duke. Snake and the President reach the containment wall and guards hoist the President up. The Duke opens fire with Snake's MAC-10, killing the guards before Snake subdues him. He attempts to shoot Snake as he is being lifted up by the rope but the President takes up a dead guard's rifle, violently guns down the Duke and hoists Snake to safety. Hauk's doctor saves Snake's life with just seconds to spare.

As the President prepares for a televised speech to the leaders at the summit meeting, he thanks Snake and tells him that he can have anything he wants. Snake then asks how he feels about the people who died saving his life. The President offers only half-hearted regret and lip service for their sacrifice, and Snake walks away in disgust. An impressed Hauk offers him a job as his deputy but Snake just keeps walking. The President's live speech commences and he plays the cassette tape. To his embarrassment, it only plays Cabbie's favorite song, "Bandstand Boogie". As Snake walks away a free man, he tears the magnetic strip out of the real tape.

Cast

In addition, frequent Carpenter collaborators Nancy Stephens appeared as the "Hijacker" and Buck Flower appeared as the "Drunk with the president's tracker", respectively, while then-active professional wrestler 
Ox Baker played "Slag". The narrator was voiced by an uncredited Jamie Lee Curtis. Actor Joe Unger filmed scenes as Snake's partner-in-crime Bill Taylor, but they were cut from the final film.

Production

Development and writing
Carpenter originally wrote the screenplay for Escape from New York in 1976, in the aftermath of Nixon's Watergate scandal. Carpenter said, "The whole feeling of the nation was one of real cynicism about the president." He wrote the screenplay, but no studio wanted to make it because, according to Carpenter, "[i]t was too violent, too scary, [and] too weird". He had been inspired by the film Death Wish, which was very popular at the time. He did not agree with this film's philosophy, but liked how it conveyed "the sense of New York as a kind of jungle, and I wanted to make a science-fiction film along these lines".

International Film Investors agreed to provide 50% of the budget, and Goldcrest Films signed a co-financing deal with them. They ended up providing £720,000 of the budget and making a profit of £672,000 from their investment after earning £1,392,000.

Casting
AVCO Embassy Pictures, the film's financial backer, preferred either Charles Bronson or Tommy Lee Jones to play the role of Snake Plissken to Carpenter's choice of Kurt Russell, who was trying to overcome the "lightweight" screen image conveyed by his roles in several Disney comedies. Carpenter refused to cast Bronson on the grounds that he was too old, and because he worried that he could lose directorial control over the film with an experienced actor. At the time, Russell described his character as "a mercenary, and his style of fighting is a combination of Bruce Lee, The Exterminator, and Darth Vader, with Eastwood's vocal-ness." All that matters to Snake, according to the actor, is "the next 60 seconds. Living for exactly that next minute is all there is." Russell used a rigorous diet and exercise program to develop a lean and muscular build. He also endeavored to stay in character between takes and throughout the shooting, as he welcomed the opportunity to get away from the Disney comedies he had done previously. He did find it necessary to remove the eyepatch between takes, as wearing it constantly seriously affected his depth perception.

Pre-production
Carpenter had just made Dark Star, but no one wanted to hire him as a director, so he assumed he would make it in Hollywood as a screenwriter. The filmmaker went on to do other films with the intention of making Escape later. After the success of Halloween, Avco-Embassy signed producer Debra Hill and him to a two-picture deal. The first film from this contract was The Fog. Initially, the second film he was going to make to finish the contract was The Philadelphia Experiment, but because of script-writing problems, Carpenter rejected it in favor of this project. However, Carpenter felt something was missing and recalls, "This was basically a straight action film. And at one point, I realized it really doesn't have this kind of crazy humor that people from New York would expect to see." He brought in Nick Castle, a friend from his film-school days at University of Southern California, who played "The Shape" in Halloween. Castle invented the Cabbie character and came up with the film's ending.

The film's setting proved to be a potential problem for Carpenter, who needed to create a decaying, semi-destroyed version of New York City on a shoestring budget. The film's production designer Joe Alves and he rejected shooting on location in New York City because it would be too hard to make it look like a destroyed city. Carpenter suggested shooting on a movie back lot, but Alves nixed that idea "because the texture of a real street is not like a back lot." They sent Barry Bernardi, their location manager (and associate producer), "on a sort of all-expense-paid trip across the country looking for the worst city in America," producer Debra Hill remembers.

Bernardi suggested East St. Louis, Illinois because it was filled with old buildings "that exist in New York now, and [that] have that seedy run-down quality" that the team was looking for. East St. Louis, sitting across the Mississippi River from the more prosperous St. Louis, Missouri, had entire neighborhoods burned out in 1976 during a massive urban fire. Hill said in an interview, "block after block was burnt-out rubble. In some places, there was absolutely nothing, so that you could see three and four blocks away." Also, Alves found an old bridge to serve as the "69th St. Bridge". The filmmaker purchased the Old Chain of Rocks Bridge for one dollar from the government and then gave it back to them, for the same amount, once production was completed, "so that they wouldn't have any liability," Hill remembers. Locations across the river in St. Louis were used, including Union Station and the Fox Theatre, both of which have since been renovated, as well as the building that would eventually become the Schlafly Tap Room microbrewery.

Filming
Carpenter and his crew persuaded the city to shut off the electricity to 10 blocks at a time at night. The film was shot from August to November 1980. It was a tough and demanding shoot for the filmmaker as he recalls. "We'd finish shooting at about 6 am and I'd just be going to sleep at 7 when the sun would be coming up. I'd wake up around 5 or 6 pm, depending on whether or not we had dailies, and by the time I got going, the sun would be setting. So for about two and a half months I never saw daylight, which was really strange." The gladiatorial fight to the death scene between Snake and Slag (played by professional wrestler Ox Baker) was filmed in the Grand Hall at St. Louis Union Station. Russell has stated, "That day was a nightmare. All I did was swing a [spiked] bat at that guy and get swung at in return. He threw a trash can in my face about five times ... I could have wound up in pretty bad shape." In addition to shooting on location in St. Louis, Carpenter shot parts of the film in Los Angeles. Various interior scenes were shot on a sound stage; the final scenes were shot at the Sepulveda Dam, in Sherman Oaks. New York served as a location, as did Atlanta, to use their futuristic-looking rapid-transit system (the latter scenes were cut from the final film). In New York City, Carpenter persuaded federal officials to grant access to Liberty Island. "We were the first film company in history allowed to shoot on Liberty Island at the Statue of Liberty at night. They let us have the whole island to ourselves. We were lucky. It wasn't easy to get that initial permission. They'd had a bombing three months earlier and were worried about trouble".

Carpenter was interested in creating two distinct looks for the movie. "One is the police state, high tech, lots of neon, a United States dominated by underground computers. That was easy to shoot compared to the Manhattan Island prison sequences, which had few lights, mainly torch lights, like feudal England". Certain matte paintings were rendered by James Cameron, who was at the time a special-effects artist with Roger Corman's New World Pictures. Cameron was also one of the directors of photography on the film. As Snake pilots the glider into the city, three screens on his control panel display wireframe animations of the landing target on the World Trade Center and surrounding buildings. Carpenter wanted high-tech computer graphics, which were very expensive, even for such a simple animation. The effects crew filmed the miniature model set of New York City they used for other scenes under black light, with reflective tape placed along every edge of the model buildings. Only the tape is visible and appears to be a three-dimensional wireframe animation.

Music

Soundtrack

Release

Home media

LaserDisc releases
Escape from New York was released on LaserDisc 10 times between 1983 and 1998. A 1994 Collector's Edition includes a commentary track by John Carpenter and Kurt Russell that is still included on more recent DVD releases of the film.

DVD releases
Escape from New York was released on DVD twice by MGM (USA), and once by Momentum Pictures (UK). One MGM release is a barebones edition containing just the theatrical trailer. Another version is the Collector's Edition, a two-disc set featuring a high definition remastered transfer with a 5.1 stereo audio track, two commentaries (one by John Carpenter and Kurt Russell, another by producer Debra Hill and Joe Alves), a making-of featurette, the first issue of a comic book series titled John Carpenter's Snake Plissken Chronicles, and the 10-minute Colorado bank robbery deleted opening sequence.

MGM's special edition of the 1981 film was not released until 2003 because the original negative had gone missing. The workprint containing deleted scenes finally turned up in the Hutchinson, Kansas, salt-mine film depository.  The excised scenes feature Snake Plissken robbing a bank, introducing the character of Plissken and establishing a backstory. Director John Carpenter decided to add the original scenes into the special edition release as an extra only: "After we screened the rough cut, we realized that the movie didn't really start until Snake got to New York. It wasn't necessary to show what sent him there." The film has been released on the UMD format for Sony's PlayStation Portable.

Blu-ray release
On August 3, 2010, MGM Home Entertainment released Escape From New York as a bare-bones Blu-ray. Scream Factory, in association with Shout! Factory, released the film on a special edition Blu-ray on April 21, 2015.

Reception and legacy

Box office
Escape from New York opened in New York and Los Angeles July 10, 1981. The film grossed $25.2 million in American theaters in summer 1981.

Critical response
The film received generally positive reviews. Newsweek magazine wrote of Carpenter: "[He has a] deeply ingrained B-movie sensibility – which is both his strength and limitation. He does clean work, but settles for too little. He uses Russell well, however". In Time magazine, Richard Corliss wrote, "John Carpenter is offering this summer's moviegoers a rare opportunity: to escape from the air-conditioned torpor of ordinary entertainment into the hothouse humidity of their own paranoia. It's a trip worth taking". Vincent Canby, in his review for The New York Times, wrote, "[The film] is not to be analyzed too solemnly, though. It's a toughly told, very tall tale, one of the best escape (and escapist) movies of the season". On the other hand, in his negative review for the Chicago Reader, critic Dave Kehr, wrote "it fails to satisfy – it gives us too little of too much".

Christopher John reviewed Escape from New York in Ares Magazine #10 and commented that "It is solid summer entertainment of unusually high caliber. By not pretending to be more than it is, but by also not settling for any less than it could be, Escape becomes an exciting, fast-moving drama, the likes of which we haven't seen in years."

On Rotten Tomatoes it received an 86% positive rating based on reviews from 66 critics, with an average score of 7.20/10. The site's critical consensus was: "Featuring an atmospherically grimy futuristic metropolis, Escape from New York is a strange, entertaining jumble of thrilling action and oddball weirdness". On Metacritic it has a score of 76% based on reviews from 12 critics, indicating "generally favorable reviews".

Cyberpunk pioneer William Gibson credits the film as an influence on his 1984 science fiction novel Neuromancer. "I was intrigued by the exchange in one of the opening scenes where the Warden says to Snake 'You flew the Gullfire over Leningrad, didn't you?' It turns out to be just a throwaway line, but for a moment it worked like the best SF where a casual reference can imply a lot". Popular video game director Hideo Kojima has referred to the film frequently as an influence on his work, in particular the Metal Gear series. Solid Snake is partially influenced by the character Snake Plissken. In Metal Gear Solid 2: Sons of Liberty Snake uses the alias "Pliskin" to hide his real identity during most of the game. J. J. Abrams, producer of the 2008 film Cloverfield, mentioned that a scene in his film, which shows the head of the Statue of Liberty crashing into a New York street, was inspired by the poster for Escape from New York. Empire magazine ranked Snake Plissken number 29 in their "The 100 Greatest Movie Characters" poll.

Other media

Sequels

A sequel, Escape from L.A., was released in 1996, with Carpenter returning along with Russell, now also acting as producer and co-writer.

A remake for Escape from New York began development in 2007, when New Line Cinema won the rights to remake in a bidding war. Gerard Butler was attached to play Snake Plissken, Neal H. Moritz would produce through his Original Film company, and Ken Nolan would be in charge of the screenplay. Len Wiseman was announced to direct, but was later replaced by Brett Ratner, who also stepped off the project. In April 2010, Variety reported that Breck Eisner was being looked at to direct a remake of Escape from New York, with David Kajganich and Allan Loeb providing revisions to the script. It was later announced in 2011 that New Line had dropped the remake completely. In January 2015, 20th Century Fox purchased the remake rights, with The Picture Company producing. In March 2017, it was announced that Robert Rodriguez would direct a remake of the film with Carpenter producing it. In February 2019, it was reported that Leigh Whannell will be writing the script after Luther creator Neil Cross completed a recent iteration of the project. Wyatt Russell, son of Kurt, was considered to portray Snake Plissken, but he expressed no interest in playing the role, considering it "career suicide." On November 17, 2022, it was revealed that Radio Silence would be directing the film, with Andrew Rona, Alex Heineman, and Radio Silence producing, and Carpenter serving as an executive producer. They are currently searching for a writer. In December 2022, the film was confirmed to be a sequel, rather than a remake.

Novelization
In 1981, Bantam Books published a movie tie-in novelization written by Mike McQuay that adopts a lean, humorous style reminiscent of the film. The novel includes significant scenes that were cut from the film, such as the Federal Reserve Depository robbery that results in Snake's incarceration. The novel provides background on the relationship between Snake and Hauk—presenting the characters as disillusioned war veterans, and deepening the relationship that was only hinted in the film. The novel also explains how Snake lost his eye during the Battle for Leningrad in World War III, how Hauk became warden of New York, and Hauk's quest to find his crazed son, who lives somewhere in the prison. The novel gives greater detail on the world in which these characters live, at times presenting a future even bleaker than the one depicted in the film. It explains that the West Coast is a no-man's land, and the nation's population is gradually being driven insane by nerve gas as a result of World War III. The novel also clarifies that the president's plan for the cassette tape is not benevolent. Rather than presenting to the world a new energy source in the form of nuclear fusion (as claimed in the film), the tape actually reveals the successful development of a "fallout-free thermonuclear weapon, which would grant the US supremacy in the global conflict.

Comic books
Marvel Comics released the one-shot The Adventures of Snake Plissken in January 1997. The story takes place sometime between Escape from New York and before his famous Cleveland escape mentioned in Escape from L.A. Snake has robbed Atlanta's Centers for Disease Control of some engineered metaviruses and is looking for buyers in Chicago. Finding himself in a deal that is really a set-up, he makes his getaway and exacts revenge on the buyer for ratting him out to the United States Police Force. In the meantime, a government lab has built a robot called ATACS (Autonomous Tracking And Combat System) that can catch criminals by imprinting their personalities upon its program to predict and anticipate a specific criminal's every move. The robot's first test subject is America's public enemy number one, Snake Plissken. After a brief battle, the tide turns when ATACS copies Snake to the point of fully becoming his personality. Now recognizing the government as the enemy, ATACS sides with Snake. Unamused, Snake sucker punches the machine and destroys it. As ATACS shuts down, it can only ask him, "Why?" Snake just walks off, answering, "I don't need the competition".

In 2003, CrossGen published John Carpenter's Snake Plissken Chronicles, a four-part comic book miniseries. The story takes place a day or so after the events of Escape from New York. Snake has been given a military Humvee after his presidential pardon and makes his way to Atlantic City. Although the director's cut of Escape from New York shows Snake was caught after a bank job, this story has Snake finishing up a second heist that was planned before his capture. The job entails stealing the car in which John F. Kennedy was assassinated from a casino before delivering it to a buyer in the Gulf of Mexico. Snake partners with a man named Marrs who ends up double-crossing him. Left for dead in a sinking crab cage, Snake escapes and is saved by a passing fisherman named Captain Ron (an in-joke referring to Kurt Russell's 1992 comedy, Captain Ron). When Ron denies Snake's request to use his boat to beat Marrs to the robbery, Snake decides to kill him. When Snake ends up saving Ron from the Russian mob, who wants money, Ron changes his mind and helps Snake. Once at the casino, Snake comes face-to-face with Marrs and his men, who arrive at the same time, ending in a high-speed shootout. Snake gets away with the car and its actress portraying Jackie Kennedy, leaving Marrs to be caught by the casino owner, who cuts him a deal to bring his car back and live. After some trouble, Snake manages to finally get the car to the buyer's yacht, using Ron's boat, and is then attacked by Marrs. Following the firefight, the yacht and car are destroyed, Marrs and Captain Ron are dead, and Snake makes his escape in a helicopter with the 30 million credits owed to him for the job.

In 2014, BOOM! Studios began publishing an Escape from New York comic book by writer, Christopher Sebela. The first issue of the series was released on December 3, 2014, and the story picks up moments after the end of the film.

BOOM! released a crossover comics miniseries between Snake and Jack Burton titled Big Trouble in Little China/ Escape from New York in October 2016.

Board games
An Escape from New York board game was released in 1981 by TSR, Inc.  Another board game was crowd-funded in 2022.

Cancelled anime
In 2003, Carpenter was planning an anime spin-off of Escape from New York, with Outlaw Stars Mitsuru Hongo slated to direct.

References

Further reading
John Walsh,Escape From New York: The Official Story of the Film, Titan Books, December 14th, 2021.

External links

 
 
 
 
 Escape from New York at John Carpenter's official website

1981 films
1980s dystopian films
1980s English-language films
1980s science fiction action films
American independent films
American science fiction action films
American dystopian films
Embassy Pictures films
Films about fictional presidents of the United States
Films about prison escapes
Films directed by John Carpenter
Films produced by Debra Hill
Films scored by John Carpenter
Films scored by Alan Howarth (composer)
Films set in 1988
Films set in 1997
Films set in the future
Films set in New York City
Films shot in Atlanta
Films shot in Los Angeles
Films shot in Missouri
Films shot in New York City
Films shot in St. Louis
Films with screenplays by John Carpenter
Goldcrest Films films
Snake Plissken Chronicles
American exploitation films
StudioCanal films
Urban survival films
Films about Air Force One
1980s American films